Aqua Anio Novus (Latin for "New Anio aqueduct") was an ancient Roman aqueduct supplying the city of Rome. Like the Aqua Claudia, it was begun by emperor Caligula in 38 AD and completed in 52 AD by Claudius, who dedicated them both on August 1. 

Together with the Aqua Anio Vetus, Aqua Marcia and Aqua Claudia, it is regarded as one of the "four great aqueducts of Rome."

Route

Frontinus describes its source as near that of the Aqua Claudia and "forty-second milestone on the via Sublacensis, in the district of Simbruvium.​ The water is taken from the river which, even without the effect of rainstorms, is muddy and discoloured, because it has rich and cultivated fields adjoining it and in consequence loose banks." Its flow at the intake was 197,000 m3 a day. The aqueduct was freely used to supply the deficiencies of other aqueducts by using cross-channels at several points along the route controlled by sluice gates, and being turbid, rendered them impure.

To improve the quality of the water Trajan connected additional sources from the two uppermost of the three lakes formed by Nero for the adornment of his villa at Subiaco, thus lengthening the aqueduct to 58 miles and 700 paces. The lakes were created by dams in the river, and were the tallest of any built by the Romans. They were swept away by the river in the Medieval period.  

The aqueduct was split into two channels above Tivoli and combined again near Gericomo. From its filtering tank near the seventh milestone of the Via Latina, it was carried on the arches of the Aqua Claudia, in a channel immediately superposed on the latter. It terminated at a great tank on the Esquiline Hill near the temple of Minerva Medica.

The Aqua Anio Novus had the highest water level of all the aqueducts that came into Rome which allowed it to reach the highest districts, but also necessitated a route that was higher than the others with taller bridges.
 
It was built of tuff and brick.

Bridges 

Aqua Anio Novus bridges visible today include: Ponte degli Arci, Ponte Arcinelli, Ponte Sant Antonio and Ponte Barucelli.

Ponte Sant Antonio 

The Ponte S. Antonio is considered one of the most beautiful bridges of aqueducts supplying Rome. It crosses the Acqua Raminga stream and is named after an ancient sanctuary now disappeared.

The central and original nucleus of the bridge was of opus quadratum, of which the imposing central arch stands out, 32 m high and 10 m span. Spurs are visible on the various pylons, which were used to hook and support the scaffolding both during the construction of the bridge, but above all during the numerous restorations. In the post-Severan period it was reinforced by covering it almost completely with brick-clad opus caementicium and adding small arches at the bottom of the bridge.

On the east side of the bridge, on the south pillar near the stream, is a part of a supporting arch never completed, a sign that the bridge underwent several design changes during its construction. On the west side of the bridge, the channel turns at right angles and can be followed for several tens of metres.

Ponte Barucelli

The Ponte Barucelli (also known as Ponte Diruto) is made up of two monumental bridges 8 m apart for the Anio Novus (to the south) and the aqua Claudia (to the north) to cross the Acqua Nera stream. Both date to between 38 and 52 AD. They were later strengthened with buttresses and reinforcements, becoming two huge continuous and connected structures.

The Anio Novus bridge, about 85 m long and about 10 m wide, has a few small arches except for the main high and narrow one for the Acqua Nera. It had originally been built of tuff in opus quadratum. In the second half of the 1st century it was reinforced in opus mixtum, visible at the two east end buttresses. At the beginning of the 3rd century nine rectangular buttresses were added at regular intervals on the north side while on the south side only three were added near the bed of the stream, later increased by five on the west bank in poor opus latericium and two on the east in opus mixtum.

Later the two bridges were connected by three brick arches and with buttresses.

See also
List of aqueducts in the city of Rome
List of aqueducts in the Roman Empire
List of Roman aqueducts by date
Parco degli Acquedotti
Ancient Roman technology
Roman engineering

References

External links

Subiaco Roman dams
Map of Rome with Anio Novus running (red)
Travertine reveals ancient Roman aqueduct supply

Buildings and structures completed in the 1st century
Ancient Roman aqueducts in Rome
50s establishments in the Roman Empire
1st-century establishments in Italy
Claudius
Caligula
52 establishments